Gurcharan Singh Dadhahoor is an Indian politician belonging to the Indian National Congress. He was elected to the Lok Sabha, lower house of the Parliament of India, from Sangrur in Punjab.

References

External links
 Official biographical sketch in Parliament of India website

1942 births
Lok Sabha members from Punjab, India
India MPs 1989–1991
Living people